Peni may refer to:

Rudimentary Peni, a British anarcho-punk band
Peni Tagive (b. 1988), an Australian rugby league player
Peni Terepo (b. 1991), a New Zealand rugby league player
Péni, a town in Burkina Faso in Péni Department
Péni Department, in Burkina Faso
Peni, Chad, in Chad
Peni (tribe), a people of the pre-Roman Astures, in current Spain
Peni, a Hawaiian male given name, spoken form of the pet name Ben, ; spoken form of the English name Bennett is Peneki, .
 Peni Parker, an alternate dimension version of Spider-Man from Earth-14512

See also 
Peniki
Penis